National Highway 353D, commonly called NH 353D is a national highway in  India. It is a spur road of National Highway 53. NH-353D traverses the state of Maharashtra in India.

Route 
NH353D links Nagpur, Umred, Bhiwapur, Nagbhir, Bramhapuri and Armori in the state of Maharashtra.

Junctions  
 
  Terminal near Nagpur.
  near Umred.
  near Umred.
  near Nilaj.
  near Bramhapuri.
  Terminal near Armori.

See also 
 List of National Highways in India
 List of National Highways in India by state

References

External links 
 NH 753D on OpenStreetMap

National highways in India
National Highways in Maharashtra